James Dobbin (born 17 September 1963) is a Scottish former professional footballer, who played as a midfielder from 1980 until 2000.

He played for Celtic, Barnsley and Grimsby Town. He also played for Motherwell, Doncaster Rovers, Rotherham United, Scarborough, Southport, Gainsborough Trinity, Boston United and Whitby Town.

Career
A schoolboy international, Dobbin started his career at Celtic. In 1982, he was part of the Scotland under-18 squad which won the European Under-18 Championship, although he missed out due to injury. Dobbin's chances at Celtic were limited and he made only a handful of league appearances, with a similar return from a loan spell at Motherwell.

In March 1984, Dobbin left Scotland and moved to Doncaster Rovers, signing alongside Scotland under-18 colleague John Philliben. Dobbin spent two-and-a-half years at Belle Vue before moving to Barnsley in 1986. Spending five years at Oakwell, Dobbin featured in over 100 league matches for The Tykes, before beginning the first of two spells with Grimsby Town in 1991. Dobbin's £200,000 move saw him go on to make over 150 league appearances for Grimsby before his release at the end of the 1995–96 season. From here, Dobbin spent a year with Rotherham United, appearing in around half of the club's matches before re-joining Doncaster for the 1997–98 season. A regular during this season, Doncaster were struggling at the bottom and released Dobbin before the end of the season, allowing him to join Scarborough. After just one match, Dobbin returned to Grimsby, featuring twice in the remainder of the season. He played another four matches at the start of the following season before being loaned to Southport for the latter part. In 1999-00, Dobbin spent time with three part-time clubs, turning out for Gainsborough Trinity, Boston United and Whitby Town before retiring at the end of the season.

Personal life
After his retirement from football, Dobbin worked on a building site, and as a gas engineer for Npower. He also covers Barnsley home games for Opta. His daughter Beth Dobbin is an athlete who broke the Scottish women's 200m record in 2018 and represented Great Britain and Northern Ireland at the 2018 Athletics World Cup.

Masters football
Since his retirement he has played in three Masters football tournaments for Celtic once and twice for Barnsley. Most recently, he helped to guide Barnsley to local victory in the Yorkshire masters and even struck home a thunderous right- footed strike in the final against Sheffield Wednesday to force the game into penalties where he tucked his away past the despairing Kevin Pressman.

Honours

Scotland
 European Under-18 Championship: 1982

Grimsby Town
 Football League Trophy: Winners: 1998
 Football League Division Two: Play-off winners''': 1998

References

External links
 
 

1963 births
Footballers from Dunfermline
Living people
Scottish footballers
Scottish Football League players
English Football League players
Celtic F.C. players
Motherwell F.C. players
Doncaster Rovers F.C. players
Barnsley F.C. players
Grimsby Town F.C. players
Rotherham United F.C. players
Scarborough F.C. players
Southport F.C. players
Gainsborough Trinity F.C. players
Boston United F.C. players
Whitby Town F.C. players
Association football midfielders